Future Park Rangsit (formerly known as Future Park Plaza Rangsit) is one of Asia's largest malls, located on Phahonyothin Road in Pathum Thani. The area is a gateway to the provinces of central, northern and northeastern Thailand. Covering , Future Park Rangsit opened on March 17, 1995.

The mall houses are more than 70 restaurants and food outlets, eight major banks and financial institutions, a post office and outlets for all phone networks and mobile phone service providers. Entertainment options include multiplex cinemas and D-Cine private theaters, which feature karaoke and on-demand movies as needed.

Anchor tenants in the plaza include:
Central Department Store
Robinson Department Store
Big C
Tops
Power Buy (electronic specialty store)
Supersports (sport product retailer)
B2S (books, music, and stationery)
Fitness First (Health Club)
 HarborLand
 Major Cineplex 10 Cinemas

The three largest tenants alone occupy  of Future Park Rangsit—the  Home Pro, the  Major Cineplex and the  Index Living Mall.

The huge complex currently has 120,000 shoppers on weekdays and 150,000 on weekends.

See also
 List of shopping malls in Bangkok
 List of shopping malls in Thailand

References

Shopping malls in Bangkok
Buildings and structures in Pathum Thani province
Shopping malls established in 1995
Tourist attractions in Pathum Thani province
1995 establishments in Thailand